Gervase Duan Spradlin (August 31, 1920 – July 24, 2011) was an American actor, attorney, and businessman. Known for his distinctive accent and voice, he often played devious authority figures. He is credited in over 70 television and film productions, and performed with actors such as Robby Benson, Marlon Brando, Al Pacino, James Garner, Charlton Heston, George C. Scott, and Johnny Depp.

Early life
Spradlin was born on August 31, 1920 in Pauls Valley, Oklahoma. His parents both worked as schoolteachers. Spradlin obtained his bachelor's degree in Education from the University of Oklahoma. He was a member of the Delta Chi fraternity. He then served in the United States Army Air Force during World War II, where he was stationed in China.

After his military service, Spradlin returned to the University of Oklahoma, where he completed a law degree in 1948.

Career before acting
Spradlin's career as an attorney began in Venezuela. He transitioned to become an independent oil producer, forming Rouge Oil Company. 

Before he turned to acting, he was active in local politics, and he campaigned for John F. Kennedy in 1959.

Acting career
In 1964, Spradlin joined the Oklahoma Repertory Theatre.

A notable break for Spradlin resulted from his work in television in the 1960s. Casting director Fred Roos had cast Spradlin in television shows such as I Spy (as the immediate superior of Pentagon spies Kelly Robinson and Alexander Scott in the episode "Tonia"), Mannix (in an uncredited role as Senator Sid Abernathy in the episode "Turn Every Stone"), and Gomer Pyle, U.S.M.C. (as visiting Colonel Driscoll in the episode "Gomer Pyle Super Chef"). 

He worked with Jack Webb on the series Dragnet, playing multiple roles from a safecracker to a low-level con man. In 1968, he appeared as a false police sergeant, Preston C. Densmore, in S10:E13, “The Phony Police Racket”. Spradlin portrayed Commander Maurice E. "Germany" Curts, Communications Officer, U.S. Pacific Fleet, in an uncredited role in Tora! Tora! Tora! in 1970. He was also in the counter-culture film Zabriskie Point (1970). 

When Roos co-produced The Godfather Part II, he recommended Spradlin for the role of Pat Geary, a corrupt U.S. senator from Nevada, and Spradlin played a senator in the 1976 TV miniseries Rich Man, Poor Man Book II. In 1977, he guest-starred along with Ruth Gordon and Mariette Hartley in the Columbo episode, "Try and Catch Me". His film credits included One on One (1977) (as an authoritarian basketball coach) and Apocalypse Now (as General Corman, the somber officer who assigns Martin Sheen's character to the search mission). He played the head football coach B.A. Strother in North Dallas Forty (1979), and "Carolina Military Institute" commandant General Durrell in The Lords of Discipline (1983).

In 1984, Spradlin played a villainous Southern sheriff in Tank. In 1985, Spradlin portrayed President Lyndon B. Johnson in the mini-series Robert Kennedy and His Times, based on the book of the same name by presidential historian Arthur M. Schlesinger Jr. In 1986, he again portrayed an American president when he played Andrew Jackson in the television movie Houston: The Legend of Texas. Also in 1986, he starred in the miniseries Dream West. In 1988, he played Admiral Raymond A. Spruance in the miniseries War and Remembrance. In 1989, Spradlin played a small role in the film The War of the Roses as a divorce lawyer, with Michael Douglas and Kathleen Turner.

Spradlin played a minister in Ed Wood (1994), a conspirator in the attempted assassination of a state governor in Nick of Time (1995), Bishop Dyer in the TV movie Riders of the Purple Sage (1996), which was adapted from Zane Grey's 1912 novel of the same name, and the President of the United States in The Long Kiss Goodnight (1996).

Spradlin retired from acting after Dick (1999), in which he played Ben Bradlee. Although lending his likeness, he did not reprise his role as Pat Geary (whom in-game was voiced by Chris Edgerly) in Electronic Arts' video game adaptation of The Godfather Part II in 2009.

Personal life and death 
Spradlin's first wife, Nell, with whom he had two daughters, died in 2000. In 2002, he married Frances Hendrickson.

Spradlin died of natural causes at his cattle ranch in San Luis Obispo, California, on July 24, 2011. He was 90 years old.

Filmography

References

External links

1920 births
2011 deaths
Male actors from Oklahoma
American male film actors
American male television actors
Oklahoma Democrats
Oklahoma lawyers
University of Oklahoma alumni
United States Army Air Forces personnel of World War II
People from San Luis Obispo, California
People from Pauls Valley, Oklahoma
Military personnel from Oklahoma
20th-century American lawyers